The Calamopityales are an extinct order of plants belonging to Pteridospermatophyta, or seed ferns.

References

Pteridospermatophyta
Carboniferous plants
Prehistoric plant orders
Mississippian first appearances
Mississippian extinctions